Kulachor is a town adjacent to Jalalpur Jattan in the district of Gujrat, Pakistan. It is situated about 16 kilometers in north east of Gujrat. It was built as a city by Chandragupta Maurya in 300 BC.

References

Villages in Gujrat District
Archaeological sites in Punjab, Pakistan
Maurya Empire